Richfield is a name for several high schools in North America, including:

Richfield High School (Idaho), Richfield, Idaho
Richfield High School (Minnesota), Richfield, Minnesota
Richfield High School (Utah), Richfield, Utah

Also:
Richfield High School (Waco), formerly located in Waco, Texas